Tbong Khmum Football Club (Khmer: ខេត្តត្បូងឃ្មុំ), is a football club based in Tbong Khmum Province, Cambodia. The club competes in the Hun Sen Cup, the major national cup competition of Cambodian football. The team represents the Province and competes annually in the Provincial Stage of the competition.

Current squad

Honours
2019 Hun Sen Cup Provincial Stage : Champion.

References

https://cncc-football.com/hun-sen-cup.html

External links 
Hun Sen Cup

Football clubs in Cambodia